Chloronia mirifica is an insect in the family Corydalidae. It occurs from Mexico to Peru.

References 

Insects of Central America
Corydalidae